Triumph is a fictional former superhero in the DC Comics universe whose first full appearance was in Justice League America #92 (September 1994). He was created by Brian Augustyn, Mark Waid and Howard Porter, though the character is primarily associated with writer Christopher Priest. He is not the Golden Age hero Captain Triumph, a fellow DC Comics property.

Years after Triumph's initial appearance, Priest revealed that the character was partially based on Neal Pozner, DC's Director of Creative Services: "His shtick was: Triumph was always right... it was what made him so annoying to his fellow heroes. ... Neal, write this down someplace, was always right. He was. At the end of the day, Neal would be proven right. That fact, more than anything else, annoyed many staffers beyond reason".

History 
Triumph is a superhero with the ability to control electromagnetic fields. He was a founding member of the original Justice League, although nobody except him remembers this. Their first mission involved him making an epic sacrifice that wiped his existence out of everyone's memory. Years later, he returned through a time rift during Zero Hour and found that the League would not accept him. Angry and bitter at this lack of recognition, he is forced to start over working with the Justice League Task Force. Triumph was created by Mark Waid, Brian Augustyn, and Howard Porter, Afik Ahmed Pious first appearing in Justice League America #91. (1994)

Publication history 
The character Triumph (real name: William MacIntyre, sometimes spelled William McIntyre) was portrayed as a hot-headed, arrogant and self-righteous individual who felt he was "denied his destiny" to become one of Earth's greatest heroes. Via a retcon in a three-part story running through Justice League America #92, Justice League Task Force #16 and Justice League International (vol. 2) #68, he was revealed to have been a founding member of the Justice League, serving as their leader.  On his first mission with the fledgling Justice League, Triumph seemingly "saved the world", but was teleported into a dimensional limbo that also affected the timestream, resulting in no one having any memory of him and his original peers now being veterans.

DC Comics fans initially disliked the character; Christopher Priest and editor Brian Augustyn decided to play to this by having the characters dislike him as well.

Return from limbo
One of Triumph's motivations for becoming a superhero was that his father was a low-ranking henchman for supervillains, a life that worried his mother. The young Triumph, however, misinterpreted her concern as a sign that his father was abusive and his henchman outfit to mean that his father had been a major supervillain. Another motivation was a visit by the Hourman, whom the child would grow up idolizing (and who had arrested his father).

When he first returned from the dimensional limbo to the modern era, Triumph's meeting with Justice League International quickly devolved into a violent confrontation. He ended up starring in a significant portion of the Justice League Task Force comic book (issues #0 and 16–37), alongside regulars the Ray and Gypsy; he developed a strong relationship with the Ray and saved Gypsy's life, though he later claimed he had almost let her die out of fear of dying himself and thought that it would "look bad" if he did not save her. Dissatisfied with the infrequency of JLTF missions, he also founded a second team of his own to target perpetrators of violent crime and completely dismantle their organizations.

His attitude ultimately resulted in his expulsion from the Justice League Task Force. Alternatively, it could be seen that J'onn J'onzz fired Triumph because of Triumph regularly not consulting him.

In JLTF #30, Triumph receives a carved black candle from the demon Neron, which could give him his lost decade back in exchange for his soul. In JLTF #37, the final issue, Triumph tried to make amends with J'onn and admits to his anger at the League Christmas party – only to blow up and storm out when he was not let back into the group. He considered lighting the candle, despondent and weary with his failed career, but Gypsy came after him and, without knowing, convinced him to leave the candle by pointing out he had saved her life. Triumph decided his life might have meaning and went back to talk to J'onn, but the Ray and Gypsy unwittingly lit his candle for a memorial. Triumph gained back his lost decade after all, but found the League was the same as it had always been and Gypsy was still alive even without his presence.

Writer Christopher Priest has stated that Triumph's lost soul explains his future appearances as an evil character.

Fall from grace and death
Later during DC's 1990s resurrection of the JLA ongoing series, Triumph was destitute and a failure, resorting to selling stolen League items to supervillains just to pay his rent. Because of this, he came under the influence of an evil imp from the Fifth Dimension named Lkz, similar to the one possessed by Golden Age Justice Society member Johnny Thunder. Triumph mind-controlled his former Justice League Task Force teammates Gypsy and the Ray, striking at the newly reformed JLA. He believed he was using Lkz to fake a disaster that would overwhelm the current JLA so much that "his" team could step in, while Lkz simply intended to destroy the world. The combined forces of the JSA and JLA were required to stop the rampaging Thunderbolt and subdue Triumph, culminating in Johnny Thunder's Thunderbolt merging with Lkz to become a new purple Thunderbolt (now summoned by the phrase "So Cool").

Throughout his attack, Triumph expressed disgruntlement with the League's alleged elitism, accusing the League of ignoring his team after the "headliners" came back, and claiming (in JLA #30) that Aquaman (who had been teammates with Gypsy in the "Detroit" League) had not cared about Gypsy and happily ignored her and "the old days" "once he made the dream". To Triumph's ultimate shock, Superman told him that he had been "a fine Leaguer" and would have been "welcomed any time" if only he had simply asked.

At the end of this story arc, the then-hostless Spectre-Force transformed Triumph into an ice statue and prepared to smash him with a hammer, but was stopped by a compassionate plea by the angel Zauriel. His frozen form was stored in the Justice League Watchtower, marked "Founding Member of the J.L.A." as a memorial. Grant Morrison, the writer of this story, later had Prometheus destroy the Watchtower, but forgot to remove Triumph; he was confirmed dead a few years later.

Later mentions
Several years after Triumph's death, it was revealed that he had unknowingly sired a son named Jonathan. During a college protest against the construction of a nuclear reactor, the deranged teenager manifested superhuman abilities similar to those of his father. After going on a rampage and killing 19 people (including his girlfriend Christie), Jonathan was confronted by Supergirl and Raven of the Teen Titans. The two used Raven's abilities to enter Jonathan's mind, where they learned that he had been driven insane by fractured visions of Triumph's removal from history and subsequent return, as well as the changes in history caused by Superboy-Prime's actions during Infinite Crisis. Raven was ultimately able to defeat Jonathan by conjuring an image of Triumph, who persuaded his son to stop his murderous actions. Jonathan then disappeared in a blinding flash of light, and exactly what became of him after this is unknown.

Triumph was briefly mentioned by Doctor Light during his battle with Kimiyo Hoshi in Blackest Night. He was mockingly used as an example of once-prominent heroes who were quickly forgotten after their deaths, a fate that Light claimed was in store for Kimiyo.

Trinity
In the 2009 52-issue weekly miniseries Trinity, Triumph was revealed as alive in the warped reality created by the forceful extraction of the Trinity formed by Batman, Superman and Wonder Woman. There, he was a member of Justice Society International and had camaraderie with fellow hero and Trinity stand-in the Tomorrow Woman. Both were informed by Hawkman that according to a scroll detailing the true timeline, they were supposed to be dead, but Triumph still fought to restore the timeline.

In the end, he took an attack meant for the Tomorrow Woman and saved her life at the cost of his own. He died in her arms, wondering if she could see the world that they were fighting for. She, in turn, promised to stay alive long enough to see it.

Powers and abilities

Though not fully elaborated, Triumph's powers were said to be control over the electromagnetic spectrum. This power gives Triumph what he calls "360 degree hyper senses" or what could be described as a form of electromagnetic psychometry, which allowed him to perceive and to interpret the entire electromagnetic spectrum. With this ability Triumph could "hear" TV and radio signals and decode satellite transmissions. Triumph also displayed advanced electromagnetic energy manipulation; Superman even remarked that Triumph could kill Superman himself by cutting off the solar energy from Superman's cells to the rest of his body.

Triumph can bend the electromagnetic energy around him for offensive purposes. For instance, he can store energy in his hands and send it through metallic wiring as a powerful electric current. He can project powerful electric blasts from his eyes capable of melting thick plastic or rubber objects, or even shredding through steel alloys like confetti.

Other uses of Triumph's electromagnetic powers include creating a force field around his body granting him invulnerability as long as he is actively thinking about creating one. He has the ability to change the density of matter using his electromagnetic powers, e.g., changing water into a solid ramp. He can absorb and channel energy directed at him, such as fire. Triumph can also use his electromagnetic powers to triple the g-force inside a magnetic field while pressurizing the field to several atmospheres creating a stasis field, essentially freezing everyone inside the field.

Triumph may also possess high-level physical strength, speed, and invulnerability—on at least one occasion he engaged in hand-to-hand combat with Superman and claimed: "I'm as strong as you, I'm as fast as you, I have powers you don't even have names for..."

Triumph only possesses superhuman powers when he has a connection to the electromagnetic spectrum; without that source he has no powers.

References

External links
 Digital Priest archive of the script for Triumph #1
 Christopher J. Priest essay on Triumph (archived)
 Triumph at the DC Database Project
 

Comics characters introduced in 1994
Characters created by Mark Waid
DC Comics titles
DC Comics characters with superhuman strength
DC Comics LGBT superheroes
DC Comics LGBT supervillains
DC Comics male superheroes
DC Comics male supervillains
Fictional gay males
Comics based on real people
DC Comics metahumans
Fictional characters from parallel universes
Fictional characters with electric or magnetic abilities